Wendy Blunsden (9 February 1942 – 1 August 2020) was an Australian cricketer who captained the Australia national women's cricket team in one Test match and played a total of seven tests. She was born in 1942 in Adelaide and made her Test debut against New Zealand in 1972.
A left-handed batswoman and right arm off break bowler, she scored 53 runs and took 7 test wickets. She played her last Test against England in 1976.

References

Further reading

External links
 Wendy Blunsden at southernstars.org.au

1942 births
2020 deaths
Australia women Test cricketers
Australia women One Day International cricketers
Cricketers from Adelaide
South Australian Scorpions cricketers